Sindhu Venkatanarayanan (born 19 June 1969) is an Indian stand-up comedian and actor who lives and performs in the United Kingdom under the name of Sindhu Vee. She starred as Mrs Phelps in the 2022 Netflix adaptation of Matilda the Musical.

Early life
She was born in New Delhi, India, the daughter of a civil servant father and teacher mother.

She has lived in Delhi, Lucknow and the Philippines. She studied at the University of Delhi, University of Oxford, University of Chicago and McGill University, and worked in banking as a "high-flying bonds tradeswoman" in London.

Vee lives in London with her Danish husband, a financier, and three children.

Career
She started performing stand-up comedy in 2012 and has performed on stage in the UK, India, and the United States. She appeared at the Edinburgh Festival Fringe each year between 2013 and 2017. Vee was nominated for the BBC New Comedy Award in 2016, was second in the 2017 Leicester Mercury Comedian of the Year and joint third in the 2017 NATYS: New Acts of the Year Show.

Film and television
Vee has made television appearances on programmes including Have I Got News For You ‘’Mock the Week’’ and Would I Lie To You? on BBC One, Richard Osman's House of Games and QI on BBC Two and Alan Davies: As Yet Untitled for Dave. As of 2018 she is the host of the BBC Radio 4 Comedy of the Week podcast, and she has also appeared on Quote... Unquote and The Unbelievable Truth.

 2020 Netflix series Sex Education Season 2: Olivia's mother
 2021 Rose Matafeo's BBC series Starstruck.
 2022 Matilda the Musical Mrs Phelps

References

External links
 
 

Living people
1969 births
21st-century comedians
Alumni of the University of Oxford
Indian expatriates in the United Kingdom
Indian stand-up comedians
Indian women comedians
McGill University alumni
University of Chicago alumni
Delhi University alumni
Women humorists
People of Indian Tamil descent
Indian people of Pakistani descent